Douglas Hamilton Bigelow (17 July 1928 – 21 June 1996) was an Australian rules footballer who played 148 senior games for the Essendon Football Club from 1947 to 1956.

Family
The son of Hiram Alfred "Jack" Bigelow (1902-1967), and Eva Nellie Bigelow (1901-1989), née Hough, Douglas Hamilton Bigelow was born on 17 July 1928.

He married Shirley June Nankervis in 1951. They had two children: Ross, and Janine.

Career
Recruited from Bentleigh Football Club, he played his first match in round 11 of the 1947 season, against Melbourne, at Essendon's home ground, Windy Hill. He went on to play 148 games for Essendon from 1947 to 1956.

He played in the "drawn" 1948 Grand Final, but was not selected for the "Grand Final Replay" the following week. He played in the losing Essendon Grand Final team in 1951.

He played in the second ruck in the highly talented 1952 Essendon Seconds Premiership team that beat Collingwood Seconds 7.14 (56) to 4.5 (29):

Excluding the senior games that some had already played (or would go on to play) with other VFL clubs, the members of the Essendon 1952 Seconds Premiership Team played an aggregate total of 1072 senior games for Essendon Firsts.

Bigelow also played in the Essendon Finals teams of 1953, which lost to Footscray 5.11 (41) to 6.13 (49), and of 1955, which lost to Geelong 7.11 (53) to 9.7 (61).

He was Acting Captain of the Essendon team on three occasions in 1956.

He was a strong, tough, dogged and tenacious defender, who also played in the ruck from time to time with great success. His great strength always gave him a great advantage at the boundary throw-ins.

Retirement
His last game for Essendon was in the first (1956) VFL night football series, held at the end of the 1956 home-and-away season, under floodlights, at Lake Oval, at Albert Park,

He coached the Victorian Football Association team Coburg Tigers from 1957 until 1961.

He also coached at his original club, Bentleigh, in 1963.

He served on the Essendon Football Club Committee from 1964 to 1976, having also served in 1954 and 1956 (whilst still a player).

Media
Almost from the inception of Australian television (November 1956), along with Percy Beames, Thorold Merrett, Doug Heywood, and Tony Ongarello, Bigelow featured in various football shows on ABC Television.

He also worked for many years as a radio commentator on Melbourne's 3LO and, later, on Melbourne's 3AW.

Footnotes

References
 Maplestone, M., Flying Higher: History of the Essendon Football Club 1872–1996, Essendon Football Club, (Melbourne), 1996. 
 Ross, J. (ed), 100 Years of Australian Football 1897–1996: The Complete Story of the AFL, All the Big Stories, All the Great Pictures, All the Champions, Every AFL Season Reported, Viking, (Ringwood), 1996. 
 Taylor, Percy, "Tomorrow's Semi-Finalists: Bombers Approach Third Target", The Argus, (Friday, 7 September 1951), p.4.

External links
 
 
 Douglas "Biggles" Bigelow, at The VFA Project.

1928 births
1996 deaths
Australian rules footballers from Victoria (Australia)
Essendon Football Club players
Coburg Football Club coaches
Australian rules football commentators
Australian television personalities
Australian radio personalities